Red Sauce Pizza is a pizzeria in Portland, Oregon.

Description 
Red Sauce Pizza is a pizzeria in Portland. In addition to pizzas, the menu includes calzones and salads. The business has sign with the text 'PIZZA' written upside down, which was previously used by another pizzeria which had occupied the space previously.

History 
Owner Shardell Dues opened Red Sauce Pizza in northeast Portland's Concordia neighborhood on October 23, 2015, in a space which previously housed Bob's Rocket Pizza. Dues had previously managed Apizza Scholls. In 2019, Red Sauce relocated to northeast Portland's Beaumont-Wilshire neighborhood.

Reception 
In 2021, Waz Wu and Brooke Jackson-Glidden included Red Sauce Pizza in Eater Portland's 2021 lists of "Where to Find Knockout Vegan Pizza in Portland" and "Where to Find Exceptional Pizzas in Portland", respectively.

See also

 Pizza in Portland, Oregon

References

External links 
 
 Red Sauce Pizza at Zomato

2015 establishments in Oregon
Beaumont-Wilshire, Portland, Oregon
Pizzerias in Portland, Oregon
Restaurants established in 2015